Terence Sylvester (born 8 January 1947) is an English musician and songwriter. He is a former member of the Escorts, the Swinging Blue Jeans (1966–1969), and the Hollies. In the latter role, he took on the high parts formerly sung by Graham Nash, who had left the band in December 1968.

Life and career

Early career/The Escorts
Sylvester grew up in Allerton, Liverpool and attended school with future Badfinger guitarist, Joey Molland. At the age of 14, Sylvester was employed for a time as a panel beater by George Harrison's brother. The group he co-founded, the Escorts, appeared with the Beatles in the early 1960s. The Escorts recorded their cover of "Dizzy Miss Lizzy" on Fontana Records in 1964. A compilation album of the Escorts, From the Blue Angel, was issued on LP and then in 1995, on CD.

The Swinging Blue Jeans
In 1966, Sylvester began a three-year stint with the Swinging Blue Jeans, replacing guitarist/vocalist Ralph Ellis.

The Hollies
Sylvester's debut with the Hollies in January 1969 saw him sing on the UK chart hit singles "Sorry Suzanne" and "He Ain't Heavy, He's My Brother", plus on the albums Hollies Sing Dylan and Hollies Sing Hollies (both 1969), which debuted Sylvester's songwriting. His first song for the group was "Gloria Swansong", and he continued to write by himself ("Pull Down the Blind", "Cable Car" 1971), with Allan Clarke ("Why Didn't You Believe", "Man Without a Heart", "Perfect Lady Housewife") and as part of Clarke-Hicks-Sylvester.

This trio composed most of the Hollies songs on several albums: Confessions of the Mind (1970), Hollies (1974), Another Night (1975), Write On and Russian Roulette (both 1976 – although neither of the latter two were issued in the US in their original form) plus A Crazy Steal (1978).

Some of Sylvester's work appeared on B-sides on singles including "Indian Girl" (1972), "No More Riders" (1974), in addition to singing lead vocals on the Tony Hicks and Kenny Lynch co-written song, "Oh Granny" (1972).

In addition to high harmony vocals, Sylvester also sang a brief lead vocal section on the 1970 UK hit, "Gasoline Alley Bred" (sung mostly by Allan Clarke).  He then took on a greater share of responsibilities during the 1972–73 period, when Swedish vocalist, Mikael Rickfors, temporarily replaced Clarke. Sylvester sang "Long Cool Woman in a Black Dress" on the Hollies' 1973 US tour and on American television appearances. He later sang a number of lead vocals during this period on Romany (1972). This album included a cover of Judee Sill's "Jesus Was a Crossmaker". On Out on the Road (1973), Sylvester took lead vocals on several songs including "Slow Down, Go Down", "Pick Up the Pieces", and "Mr. Heartbreaker" (which was co-written with Dean Ford of Marmalade).

After a period of discontent, partly over musical policy, Sylvester split with the Hollies in May 1981, in an incident that precipitated the resignation of bassist Bernie Calvert.

Solo work
In 1974, Sylvester released his eponymous solo album, re-releasing it as I Believe with a slightly revised track listing in 1976. Jimmy Griffin guested harmony vocals on the song "Travelin' Boy", while Sylvester cut solo versions of his Hollies songs "Cable Car", "Indian Girl", "Pick Up the Pieces Again" and later, a solo version of his 1973 Hollies song "I Had a Dream", which was added to the CD version of the album.  The 1974 single on Polydor ("For the Peace of All Mankind", an Albert Hammond cover) and a couple of singles in 1976 ("I Believe", a Stevie Wonder cover, and "End of the Line") all taken from his solo album failed to chart. In 1978, Sylvester issued the non-album singles "Too Bad Lucy Jane" and "Silver and Gold" in the UK, but these also failed to chart.  He also earlier had contributed vocals to the Alan Parsons Project's first album, Tales of Mystery and Imagination (1975), singing lead on "To One in Paradise", and providing background vocals on "The Cask of Amontillado", behind John Miles.

In 1994, a further solo album appeared, I Believe in Love, comprising live versions of both his Hollies and solo recorded songs, plus covers such as "It Never Rains in Southern California", from a concert recorded on 20 March 1994 in Germany.

Griffin & Sylvester
In 1982, Sylvester, in collaboration with Jimmy Griffin in Memphis, Tennessee, recorded and released Griffin & Sylvester on Polydor. From this album, "Please Come into My Life", was released as a single. In the mid-1990s, Sylvester teamed up with Griffin again as the duo 'Griffin & Sylvester', touring the UK and Canada as a part of the 'Soft Rock Cafe'. The friendship and partnership continued, on and off, up to Griffin's death in January 2005. Their 1982 album was re-issued on compact disc with three bonus songs in 1999.

Later releases, Rock and Roll Hall of Fame
A double album of Sylvester's recordings with the Hollies (mostly Sylvester lead vocal tracks), the Alan Parsons Project, solo, and Griffin & Sylvester entitled The Complete Works: 1969–1982, was issued in France on Magic Records in 2001.

In 2010, as a member of the Hollies, Sylvester was inducted into the Rock and Roll Hall of Fame along with Graham Nash, Allan Clarke, Tony Hicks, Bobby Elliott, Bernie Calvert and Eric Haydock.

Solo discography

Albums
1974: Terry Sylvester
1976: I Believe
1994: I Believe in Love

Singles
1974: "For the Peace of All Mankind"
1974: "Mary Anne"
1975: "End of the Line" - AUS #82
1976: "I Believe (When I Fall in Love It Will Be Forever)"
1978: "Silver and Gold"
1978: "Too Bad Lucy Jane"

with Jimmy Griffin (as Griffin & Sylvester)

Albums
1982: Griffin & Sylvester

Singles
1982: "Please Come into My Life"
1982: "Rozanne"

References

External links
Official website
[ Terry Sylvester biography] at AllMusic

1947 births
Living people
English male singers
English rock guitarists
British soft rock musicians
Musicians from Liverpool
The Hollies members
Rhythm guitarists
English male singer-songwriters
Beat musicians
English male guitarists